NEXTSat, or Next Generation Satellite and Commodities Spacecraft (NEXTSat/CSC) is an American technology demonstration satellite which was operated as part of the Orbital Express programme. It was used as a target spacecraft for a demonstration of autonomous servicing and refueling operations performed by the ASTRO satellite. Launched in March 2007, it was operated for four months, and then deactivated in orbit.

NEXTSat was launched by United Launch Alliance on an Atlas V 401 rocket; serial number AV-013. The launch occurred at 03:10 UTC on 9 March 2007, from Space Launch Complex 41 at the Cape Canaveral Air Force Station. The launch was contracted by the Space Test Program to launch the STPSat-1 spacecraft, and was named STP-1. It also deployed ASTRO; as well as FalconSAT-3, CFESat and MidSTAR-1. The launch marked the first time United Launch Alliance had launched an Atlas V, the type having previously been operated by International Launch Services.

NEXTSat is a  spacecraft, which was built by Ball Aerospace around the RS-300 satellite bus. After completing operations, the ASTRO and NEXTSat spacecraft were separated, and ASTRO performed a separation burn. On 21 July 2007, NEXTSat was deactivated. , it was expected to remain in orbit until around 2012.

References

Spacecraft launched in 2007
Derelict satellites orbiting Earth